Fair Trade Wales is an organisation based in the United Kingdom that exists to grow the Fair Trade movement in Wales. It is funded by the Welsh Assembly Government. In June 2008 it led Wales to become the world's first Fair Trade Nation and as of 2010 is working towards the second phase of Fair Trade Nation targets.

The organisation stages events during the annual Fairtrade Fortnight to raise awareness of Fairtrade in Wales.

References

External links
Fair Trade Wales
Cymru Masnach Deg
Fair Trade Wales - Cymru Masnach Deg Facebook Page
Fair Trade Wales Twitter
Fair Trade Wales Instagram

Fair trade organizations